Ajacán – variants include Xacan, Jacan, Iacan, Axaca and Axacam – was a short-lived Spanish settlement, between 1570 and 1571, near Chesapeake Bay, in what would later become Virginia.

The settlement was intended to be the capital of a larger Spanish colony, named the  Province of Axacan, straddling the future Mid-Atlantic region of the United States.  In his 1842 Historia de la Compañía de Jesús en Nueva España, Alegre said Father Juan Bautista de Segura and his companions called the province Axacan.

Some early 20th-century historians promoted the idea that the early Spanish explorers who made voyages into the Chesapeake Bay between 1565 and 1570 sailed up the Potomac River as far as Occoquan, Virginia, based on the similarity between "Axacan" of the Spanish missionary chronicles and the name of the Indian town and creek on the Potomac. The chronicles describe the failed Axacan mission in 1570, which included abandonment by their guide, and massacre of the party.

Spanish explorers

Francisco Fernández de Écija, chief pilot of Spaniards searching the Chesapeake Bay for English activities in 1609, asserted that Lucas Vázquez de Ayllón's failed colony of 1526–27, San Miguel de Gualdape, had been located on the James River somewhere near Jamestown. While some historians accepted Écija's claim, more recent scholars believe Ayllón instead went southwest, and that the "River Guandalpe" was in Georgia.

Esteban Gómez named what may have been the Chesapeake Bay, "Immaculate Conception Bay", on his 1525 expedition.   No record of the Spanish reaching a place called Axacan was made until 1559–60, the year Sacchini  says Dominican missionaries took the Indian they named Don Luis from there.  Don Luis was recorded in Viceroyalty of New Spain-Mexico in 1565.

In 1561, Pedro Menéndez de Avilés also believed he could find the Northwest Passage by way of the tributaries flowing east from the Allegheny Mountains' gaps and the rivers flowing west on the other side to the Pacific, as told them by the Native Americans at the range of Axacan.

Vincente Gonzalez described a bay he visited in 1588 where natives told him of an English settlement to the north on a river flowing into it, but did not give a name to the bay. However,  Governor of Florida Juan Menéndez Márquez in 1606 asserted that this expedition had been to the Bay of Jacan, and Lowery (1905) also thought the Chesapeake was meant.

Province of Axacan
The Chesapeake Bay was in the Province of Axacan which included the Allegheny Mountains. Virginia was not called thus at this time, before Sir Walter Raleigh and the "Virgin Queen".

The Chesapeake Bay was called "Bahia de Santa Maria" after the time of Lucas Vázquez de Ayllón. Axacan had been called "Land of The Saints" earlier. The Spanish considered this land to be in their domain. Later, Avilés apparently thought the Portuguese were in the vicinity of the mountains eighty leagues (~240 miles) to the north of the Chesapeake Bay and not a great distance from the channel connecting the bay from the "South Sea", Gulf of Mexico.

Greater Axacan and adjoining Allegheny Mountains' western slopes, Mocosa, to Ajacal (Avacal) was thought to have rivers connecting to the south and west seas at that time. It was due to what the Spanish viewed as trespassing that had brought about the order for the monks to support the Virginia mining efforts. Hernando Moyano and Juan Pardo prospected through the Cherokee range in 1566-67 and barely sufficient reports suggest mining continued into the 1690s along the Appalachian Mountain range. These had routed by land. The explorers had discovered the curiosity of interior oil springs, copper outcrops, iron ore and coal for forging. All of which were located towards the Allegheny Mountains and Unaka Range also in the province of Axacan and the northern areas of "La Floridia" as spelled on 16th-century Spanish maps. North of "The Florida" at today's Virginia was called "Land of Don Luis" by later half 16th-century Spanish.

Dominican Friars 

Paquiquino the Virginia Indian of provincial Axacan was a brother to a chief in the lower Chesapeake Bay area. His Spanish given name was Don Luis. He was reported to be from Chiskiak town on the York River. In 1559 or 1560, a Spanish vessel, perhaps, with some Dominican friars caused Paquiquino to go with them to Mexico as a guide where Aviles meets Paquiquino and thought to have learnt of the Axacan passage. Historians generally believe it was Juan Menendez Marquez who picked up Don Luis and left another Spanish boy with one of Luis' brothers the chief, a hostage in exchange. The Viceroy of New Spain had Paquiquino baptised with the name Don Luis de Velasco (Lowery 1905). Ángel de Villafañe had been in the Chesapeake Bay area in 1561. He reported the chief of the Chesapeake area Indians was called Regulus according to Francisco Sacchini. At San Mateo, Avilés sent a Captain with 32 soldiers and two Dominican friars to settle the believed route to the mountain pass and rivers that was thought to lead to the Pacific Ocean. This was supposed to have returned Luis to his Chesapeake home and develop a colony at Ajacán landing. But the two friars who had already worked in South America and the military Captain convinced the pilot to navigate back to Europe claiming bad weather for the deviation. Some accounts declare they actually made land-fall, but, were blown off point as they tried to enter the bay. This is how Luis had arrived at Seville, Spain instead of returning to the "Bay of Santa Maria". Gone for about eleven years, Don Luis had spent the past six years with Aviles. They had returned to winter at Havana by 1570. But, now the concern was about trespassers on his Pacific Ocean passage theory to the China Spice Trade. Meanwhile, it would seem that Luis harboured resentment through the years, although, the reports declare he was eager to help evangelize his kindred.

Segura Mission (1570) 

Ajacán landing included Father Segura, vice provincial of the Jesuits with seven companions, Father Luis de Quiros, Brothers Gabriel Gomez, Sancho Cevallos, Juan Bautista Mendez, Pedro de Limares, Gabriel de Solis (related to Aviles), and Cristobal Relondo, a boy named Alonso, and Indian Don Luis departed Santa Elena, just north of St. Augustine (now Parris Island), for the Chesapeake Bay on August 5, 1570. They had arrived  at Ajacán landing on September 10, 1570. They found the local people had removed themselves from the Ajacán landing area villages due to extended drought of six years. It was reported that only a few old men remained so "that they might die where their fathers had died." Indian crops there at that time was scarce and corn was brought to them. In a brief letter before the ship left the missionaries, Father Quiros wrote of the Allegheny Mountains as told him by the native, of "the entrance through the mountains and China...Three or four days journey from yonder, were the mountains, and two of these days' journey were by a river, and one or two days' travel beyond the mountains another sea is observed."  Aviles of Spain maintain his theory that the passage to the Pacific was by way of the Chesapeake Bay.

The mission called Segura Mission consisted of a hut and small chapel about two leagues, two hours canoe trip up the river of their landing, to Don Luis's brother's village. Don Luis remained with the priests as an interpreter. An expected supply vessel had not returned before winter after which Luis deserted the monks. Within four months, Luis left the missionaries to forage on their own through the winter. Father Rogal wrote of Avales' vengeance on Luis' party who committed the murders on February 8, 1571. Don Luis's brother saved the boy named Alonso from the betrayal, the only survivor. Avales' is reported not to have punished Luis' brother's village. Father Carrera wrote of the punitive action in 1572 as he had witnessed the Ajacán landing of the delayed supply vessel.

Other visitors

Giovanni da Verrazzano sailed along the Atlantic coast in 1524 in the vicinity of the mouth of the Chesapeake Bay, and was likely the first European to sight it.  Captain Vicente Gonzalez sailed around the shores of the Chesapeake in 1588 to the 39th latitude (Annapolis, Maryland).  He found and returned  evidence to St. Augustine of English at Roanoke.  The governor of Florida, Menendez Marques, sailed to the 38th latitude near today's Virginia and Maryland border in 1589. He found Vicente the Indian who claimed he was evangelized at the Segura Mission of Ajacán. Marques allowed him to return to the Florida capital with him. This was after the forming of the Iberian Union.

Ajacán Mission

The Florida priests built the Ajacán Mission at an unknown location, attributed by some as in the York River (Virginia) vicinity.  Historians attribute Spanish abandonment of the Chesapeake Bay to either the Powhatan Confederacy or privateers. Poorly documented seafaring nationals were known to fish and trade at Norfolk Anchorage.  Later in the 16th century, many pilots, as the ship's master (today's Captain) was called at that time, held English and French letters of marque to raid the Spanish treasure fleet. English privateers had been sailing to the North American coast since 1562, preying on Spanish shipping loaded with royal loot from the Spanish Main. Their provision and repair anchorage was often at the mouth of the Chesapeake Bay. This is where the easterly North Atlantic current, just north of the Sargasso Sea moves towards the Celtic Sea of Ireland and Bay of Biscay of northern Spain. Father Segura's Ajacán settlement was destroyed by the Native American Don Luis. England's Jamestown Settlement became known to the Spanish at St. Augustine in 1610. These English took the Spanish captive, who were sent by caravel to investigate, in 1611. Although many nationals came to repair or clean their ships' hauls, reprovision and trade or prospect for many decades before, it remains unclear as to who removed the Spanish presence across the mining region of Axacan before the English first permanent colony at Jamestown.

See also
Ajacán Mission
Don Luis
Juan Pardo (explorer)
Spanish colonization of the Americas
European colonization of the Americas
Catholic Church and the Age of Discovery
Maritime history

References

External links
"The Spanish Mission Colony on the Rappahannock; the First European Settlement in Virginia" by John Gilmary Shea, 1872.  Reprinted in The Indian Miscellany, edited by William Wallace Beach, 1877, pp. 333–343.

Exploration of North America
Chesapeake Bay
Native American history of Virginia
Pre-statehood history of Virginia
Colony of Virginia
Colonial United States (Spanish)
1560s in New Spain
1570s in New Spain
Spanish colonization of the Americas
Historical regions